Seyffarth is a surname. Notable people with the surname include:

 Mrs Seyffarth (1798-1843), married name of Louisa Sharpe, artist
Åke Seyffarth (1919–1998), Swedish speed skater
Gustav Seyffarth (1796–1885), German-American Egyptologist
Jan Seyffarth (born 1986), German racing driver